Taurhina is a genus of beetle belonging to the family Scarabaeidae. The name is frequently misspelled as Taurrhina following an unjustified spelling change by Kraatz in 1890 .

Species

Subgenus Neptunides J. Thomson, 1879

 Taurhina polychrous (Thomson, 1879)
 Taurhina stanleyi (Janson, 1889)

Subgenus Taurhina Burmeister, 1842

 Taurhina longiceps Kolbe, 1892
 Taurhina nireus (Schaum, 1841

References
 Biolib

 
Taxa named by Hermann Burmeister